Radical 150 or radical valley meaning "valley" is one of the 20 Kangxi radicals (214 radicals in total) composed of 7 strokes.

In the Kangxi Dictionary, there are 54 characters (out of 49,030) to be found under this radical.

 is also the 162nd indexing component in the Table of Indexing Chinese Character Components predominantly adopted by Simplified Chinese dictionaries published in mainland China.

The character  is also used as a Chinese surname.

Evolution

Derived characters

Literature

External links

Unihan Database - U+8C37

150
162